The Long Black Veil is an album by the traditional Irish folk band The Chieftains. Released in 1995, it is one of the most popular and best-selling albums by the band.  It reached number 17 in the album charts. The band teamed up with well-known musicians such as Mick Jagger of the Rolling Stones and Van Morrison. The album went gold in the U.S. and Australia, and Double-Platinum in Ireland. One of the tracks, "Have I Told You Lately That I Love You?", sung and written by Van Morrison, won the Grammy Award for Best Pop Collaboration with Vocals in 1996.

Credited collaborators include Marianne Faithfull, Mark Knopfler, Mick Jagger, Ry Cooder, Sinéad O'Connor, Sting, The Rolling Stones, Tom Jones, Van Morrison and Arty McGlynn.

The Tennessee Waltz/Mazurka was recorded at Frank Zappa's studio not long before he died. There is video evidence (available as a bootleg called 'Salad Party') that additional material was recorded during this session, though The Chieftains have not released this material.

Track listing
"Mo Ghile Mear" (Our Hero) (with Sting & Anúna) – 3:22
"The Long Black Veil" (with Mick Jagger) – 3:38
"The Foggy Dew" (with Sinéad O'Connor) – 5:20
"Have I Told You Lately That I Love You?" (with Van Morrison) – 4:40
"Changing Your Demeanour"  – 3:16
"The Lily of the West" (with Mark Knopfler) – 5:10
"Coast of Malabar" (with Ry Cooder) – 6:01
"Dunmore Lassies" (with Ry Cooder) – 5:14
"Love Is Teasin'" (with Marianne Faithfull) – 4:36
"He Moved through the Fair" (with Sinéad O'Connor) – 4:54
"Ferny Hill"  – 3:43
"Tennessee Waltz/Tennessee Mazurka" (with Tom Jones) – 3:58
"The Rocky Road to Dublin" (with The Rolling Stones) – 5:06

Personnel
The Chieftains
Martin Fay – fiddle
Seán Keane – fiddle
Kevin Conneff – bodhrán, vocals
Matt Molloy – flute
Paddy Moloney – uilleann pipes, tin whistle
Derek Bell – harp, tiompán, keyboards
Additional personnel
Colin James - guitar, mandolin
Dominic Miller, Paul Brady, Arty McGlynn, Foggy Little - guitar
Kieran Hanrahan - banjo
Terry Tulley - Scottish pipes
Carlos Nunez - Galician pipes
Brendan Begley, James Keane, Martin O'Connor - accordion
Steve Cooney - didgeridoo
Wally Minko - piano
James Blennerhassett, Ned Mann - acoustic bass
Joe Csibi, Darryl Jones, Nicky Scott - bass
Noel Eccles, Tommy Igoe, Liam Bradley - drums
Jean Butler - foot percussion
Anuna Choir, Brian Masterson, The Rolling Stones, Van Morrison, Sting, Ry Cooder, Mark Knopfler, Sinead O'Connor, Phil Coulter, Marianne Faithfull, Tom Jones - backing vocals

Charts

Certifications and sales

Sources and links

 
 U2Wanderer.org

1995 albums
The Chieftains albums
Collaborative albums
Albums produced by Chris Kimsey
Albums produced by Ry Cooder
RCA Records albums